Mie at-large district is a constituency in the House of Councillors of Japan, the upper house of the Diet of Japan (national legislature). It currently elects 2 members to the House of Councillors, 1 per election. The current representatives are:

 Hirokazu Shiba, first elected in 2004. Term ends in 2022. Member of the Constitutional Democratic Party.
 Yūmi Yoshikawa, first elected in 2013. Term ends in 2025. Member of the Liberal Democratic Party.

The district has an electorate of 1,490,455 as of May 2021.

References 

Districts of the House of Councillors (Japan)